Believe for It is the first live album by American gospel singer CeCe Winans. It was released on March 12, 2021, via Puresprings Gospel and Fair Trade Services. The deluxe edition of the album was released on April 1, 2022. The album was produced by Kyle Lee.

Believe for It was supported by the release of "Never Lost," the album's title track, and "I've Got Joy" as singles. "Never Lost" peaked at number two on the Hot Gospel Songs chart. "Believe for It" peaked atop the Hot Gospel Songs chart and at number nine on the Hot Christian Songs Chart. "I've Got Joy" peaked at number 11 on the Hot Gospel Songs chart and number 26 on the Hot Christian Songs chart. To further promote the album, Winans will embark on the Believe for It: Live In Concert tour which will span over 20 cities across the United States in the fall of 2022.

Believe for It became a commercially successful album upon its release, debuting at number one on Billboard's Top Gospel Albums Chart and at number three on Top Christian Albums Chart in the United States. The album was ranked by Billboard as the third biggest gospel album in 2022. The album garnered critical acclaim following its release. At the 52nd GMA Dove Awards in 2021, Believe for It won the GMA Dove Award for Gospel Worship Album of the Year, with the title track also being awarded the GMA Dove Award Gospel Worship Recorded Song of the Year, and "Never Lost" getting nominated for the GMA Dove Award Contemporary Gospel Recorded Song of the Year. At the 64th Annual Grammy Awards, the album was awarded the Grammy Award for Best Gospel Album, with the title track also being awarded for Best Contemporary Christian Music Performance/Song and "Never Lost" also getting awarded for Best Gospel Performance/Song. At the 2022 Billboard Music Awards, it was also nominated for the Billboard Music Award for Top Christian Album and Top Gospel Album. At the 53rd GMA Dove Awards in 2022, "Believe for It" won the GMA Dove Award for Song of the Year, "I've Got Joy" was nominated for Inspirational Recorded Song of the Year, and "Goodness of God" was nominated for Gospel Worship Recorded Song of the Year.

Background
Believe for It marks CeCe Winans' first live album in her solo career and the first non-holiday release in four years since Let Them Fall in Love (2017). The album was recorded in late 2020 at the TBN Studio in Nashville, Tennessee, with a small audience in attendance due to COVID-19 pandemic social distancing guidelines. On April 1, 2022, CeCe Winans released the deluxe edition of Believe for It, containing additional studio versions of previously released songs and a new song titled "I've Got Joy."

Music and lyrics
Grace Chaves of NewReleaseToday described Believe for It as "a compilation of some of her original songs, alongside covers of other popular worship songs from bands like Elevation Worship, Bethel Music, and artists David & Nicole Binion." Winans shared in interview with American Songwriter that she chose "songs that were popular, that people have sung in the past but also current songs that are being sung in worship times all around this nation, probably around the world," further adding that the album contains two new songs "a couple new songs that will keep it a little exciting," although the overarching focus of the album is to be "just a time of worship." "No Greater" and "Believe for It" are the two new songs on the album.

Release and promotion

Singles
On September 4, 2020, CeCe Winans released "Never Lost" as the lead single from the album. "Never Lost" peaked at number two on the US Hot Gospel Songs chart. "Never Lost" was nominated for the 2021 NAACP Image Award for Outstanding Gospel/Christian Song, the GMA Dove Award for Contemporary Gospel Recorded Song of the Year at the 2021 GMA Dove Awards, and won the 2022 Grammy Award for Best Gospel Performance/Song.

"Believe for It" was serviced to Christian radio stations in the United States on March 26, 2021, becoming the second single from the album. "Believe for It" peaked at number one on the Hot Gospel Songs chart, and number nine on the US Hot Christian Songs chart. "Believe for It" won the GMA Dove Award Gospel Worship Recorded Song of the Year at the 2021 GMA Dove Awards, and the 2022 Grammy Award for Best Contemporary Christian Music Performance/Song, It was also nominated for nominated for the 2022 NAACP Image Award for Outstanding Gospel/Christian Song. At the 2022 GMA Dove Awards, "Believe for It" won the GMA Dove Award for Song of the Year.

"I've Got Joy" impacted Christian radio stations in the United States on May 13, 2022, becoming the third single from the album. "I've Got Joy" peaked at number 11 on the Hot Gospel Songs chart, and number 26 on the US Hot Christian Songs chart. At the 53rd GMA Dove Awards in 2022, "I've Got Joy" was nominated for the GMA Dove Award for Inspirational Recorded Song of the Year.

Promotional singles
"Believe for It" was released as the first and only promotional single from the album on February 5, 2021.

Other songs
"Goodness of God" reached number three on the Hot Gospel Songs chart, and number six on the Hot Christian Songs chart, despite not being an official single. At the 53rd GMA Dove Awards in 2022, "Goodness of God" was nominated for the GMA Dove Award for Gospel Worship Recorded Song of the Year. Goodness of God became the most-used song on Tik-Tok with over 2 billion streams between August to October of 2022.

Touring
In April 2022, CeCe Winans announced the Believe for It: Live In Concert Tour, which spanned over 25 cities across the United States in the fall. The sold out tour marks Winans' first nationwide tour in over a decade. This tour commenced on September 21, 2022, in Indianapolis, Indiana, and concluded on November 4, 2022, in St. Louis, Missouri. Winans will start part two of the tour in the spring of 2023.

Reception

Critical response

In a positive review for the Journal of Gospel Music, Robert Marovich said "CeCe Winans is at the apex of her vocal strength on Believe for It, the best album JGM has heard thus far in 2021." Timothy Yap of JubileeCast praised Winans in his review of the album, saying: "On the whole, this record like the last few Winans' albums is sublime. Even after all these years of recording and performing, Winans' shows no signs of wear and tear in her vocals; in fact, she still has that uncanny ability to convey an array of emotions in her articulations." In a NewReleaseToday review, Grace Chaves wrote a positive review of the album, saying "Overall, CeCe released a great live album. From the rerelease of her classic song "Alabaster Box," to her rendition of "Goodness of God," CeCe nailed this new album. Although I enjoy shorter/upbeat songs, I still believe that she released a really solid worship album." The Washington Informer gave a favourable review of the album, saying, "Believe For It is an electrifying project that will have you feeling chills and crying (with tears of joy) upon hearing the messages in each song."

Accolades

Commercial performance
In the United States, Believe for It earned 400,000 equivalent album units in its first week of sales, and as a result debuted at number one on the Top Gospel Albums Chart and at number two on the Top Christian Albums Chart dated March 27, 2021. The sublime album sat at number one for a total of 14 weeks with over 34 million streams.

Track listing

Personnel
Credits adapted from AllMusic.

 Chris Biano — artwork, package design
 Bob Boyd — mastering
 Elicia Brown — background vocals
 Taylor Browning — choir/chorus
 Talia Clifford — A&R
 Chaz Corzine — executive producer
 Marcus Criner — choir/chorus
 Eden DeJesus — choir/chorus
 Nathan Dugger — acoustic guitar
 Alex Gomez — choir/chorus
 Mark Gutierrez — background vocals
 Russell Hall — director, producer
 Greg Ham — executive producer
 Thomas Hardin Jr. — Hammond B3
 Megan Harney — choir/chorus
 Brad Hill — lighting director
 Dwan Hill	— orchestra leader, piano, producer
 Marcus Hill — drums
 Madelyn Howze — background vocals
 Tyrone Jackson — guitar
 Chaunda Jefferson — background vocals
 Chad Landers — production design
 Kyle Lee — producer
 Jacob Lowery — bass
 Sean Moffitt — mixing
 Casey Moore — guitar
 Jake Moore — A&R
 Calvin Nowell — artwork, package design, background vocals
 Kris Rae Orlowski — photography
 David Ramirez — programming, synthesizer
 Christi Richardson — background vocals
 Bradley Rodermond — choir/chorus
 Brandon Rodermond — choir/chorus
 Michelle Schorp — choir/chorus
 Debi Selby — background vocals
 Derek Spirk — associate executive producer
 Kimberly Thomas — choir/chorus
 Illiani Torres — choir/chorus
 CeCe Winans — executive producer, primary artist, vocals
 Jemia Wingard — choir/chorus
 Jerard Woods — background vocals
 Jovaun Woods — background vocals

Charts

Weekly charts

Year-end charts

Release history

References

External links
  on PraiseCharts

2021 live albums
CeCe Winans albums